The Cambridge Ritualists were a recognised group of classical scholars, mostly in Cambridge, England, including Jane Ellen Harrison, F.M. Cornford, Gilbert Murray (actually from the University of Oxford), A. B. Cook, and others. They earned this title because of their shared interest in ritual, specifically their attempts to explain myth and early forms of classical drama as originating in ritual, mainly the ritual seasonal killings of eniautos daimon, or the Year-King.  They are also sometimes referred to as the myth and ritual school, or as the Classical Anthropologists.

Sacrifice and drama
Inspired by The Golden Bough, Gilbert Murray in 1913 proclaimed the killing of the year spirit as the "orthodox view of the origins of tragedy.  The year Daimon waxes proud and is slain by his enemy, who becomes thereby a murderer, and must in turn perish". A decade later, however, the excessively rigid application of Frazer's thesis to Greek tragedy had already begun to be challenged; and by the sixties Robert Fagles could state that "The ritual origins of tragedy are totally in doubt, often hotly debated".

Influences

Through their work in classical philology, they exerted profound influence not only on the Classics, but on literary critics, such as Stanley Edgar Hyman or Northrop Frye. Particularly affected by Émile Durkheim was F. M. Cornford, who used the French sociologist's notion of collective representations to analyze social forms of religious, artistic, philosophical, and scientific expression in classical Greece. Other significant influences on the group, particularly on Harrison, were Darwin, James Frazer, Marx, Nietzsche and Freud.

See also

References

Further reading
The Cambridge Ritualists Reconsidered: Proceedings of the First Oldfather Conference, Held on the Campus of the University of Illinois at Urbana-Champaign April 27–30, 1989, edited by W. M. Calder III
The Myth and Ritual Theory (1998), anthology edited by Robert A. Segal.
C Kluckholn, 'Myths and Rituals' Harvard Theological Review 35 (1942) 45-79

External links
 Bibliography of works by and about the Myth and Ritual School

Culture in Cambridge
Ancient Greek theatre
British literary theorists
Ritual
Classical philology
Mythology